Kep National Park is a national park in Cambodia's Kep Province that was established in 1993 and covers an area of  The nearest town lies at Kep.

The park includes a small mountain range with tracks and trails which are popular with tourists. The trails boast incredible views of Phu Quoc and the Bokor Ranges on the south and west sides, and views across islands of the vast Vietnamese marine reserve in Kiên Giang to the east side.

Gallery

References

Sources
 Protected Areas and Development in The Lower Mekong River Region, International Centre for Environmental Management.
Kep National Park in the UNEP-WCMC World Database on Protected Areas (WDPA) from the World Conservation Monitoring Centre

External links

National parks of Cambodia
Protected areas established in 1993
Geography of Kep province
Tourist attractions in Kep province